The following is a partial list of the "G" codes for Medical Subject Headings (MeSH), as defined by the United States National Library of Medicine (NLM).

This list continues the information at List of MeSH codes (G03). Codes following these are found at List of MeSH codes (G05). For other MeSH codes, see List of MeSH codes.

The source for this content is the set of 2006 MeSH Trees from the NLM.

– biological phenomena, cell phenomena, and immunity

– biological phenomena

– adaptation, biological
  – adaptation, physiological
  – acclimatization
  – estivation
  – hibernation

– biodegradation

– biogenesis

– eutrophication

– evolution
  – evolution, molecular
  – genetic speciation
  – phylogeny

– fluid shifts

– host-parasite relations

– microbiologic phenomena
  – antibiosis
  – bacterial physiology
  – bacterial adhesion
  – bacterial translocation
  – bacteriolysis
  – nitrogen fixation
  – drug resistance, microbial
  – drug resistance, bacterial
  – beta-lactam resistance
  – cephalosporin resistance
  – penicillin resistance
  – ampicillin resistance
  – methicillin resistance
  – chloramphenicol resistance
  – drug resistance, multiple, bacterial
  – kanamycin resistance
  – tetracycline resistance
  – trimethoprim resistance
  – vancomycin resistance
  – drug resistance, fungal
  – drug resistance, multiple, fungal
  – drug resistance, viral
  – drug resistance, multiple, viral
  – drug resistance, multiple
  – drug resistance, multiple, bacterial
  – drug resistance, multiple, fungal
  – drug resistance, multiple, viral
  – germ-free life
  – specific pathogen-free organisms
  – hemadsorption
  – microbial viability
  – nitrogen fixation
  – transformation, bacterial
  – viral physiology
  – antibody-dependent enhancement
  – cell transformation, viral
  – cytopathogenic effect, viral
  – hemagglutination, viral
  – inclusion bodies, viral
  – viral interference
  – virus inactivation
  – virus integration
  – lysogeny
  – virus latency
  – virus replication
  – virus activation
  – virus assembly
  – virus shedding
  – virulence

– pigmentation
  – eye color
  – hair color
  – skin pigmentation

– recovery of function

– regeneration
  – bone remodeling
  – bone regeneration
  – osseointegration
  – liver regeneration
  – nerve regeneration
  – wound healing
  – fracture healing

– remission, spontaneous
  – neoplasm regression, spontaneous

– symbiosis

– tissue survival

– cell physiology

– cell adhesion

– cell aging
  – erythrocyte aging

– cell communication
  – autocrine communication
  – bystander effect
  – embryonic induction
  – paracrine communication
  – signal transduction
  – mechanotransduction, cellular

– cell compartmentation
  – chromosome positioning

– cell count
  – blood cell count
  – erythrocyte count
  – reticulocyte count
  – leukocyte count
  – lymphocyte count
  – cd4 lymphocyte count
  – cd4-cd8 ratio
  – platelet count
  – sperm count

– cell cycle
  – cell division
  – cell nucleus division
  – anaphase
  – chromosome segregation
  – meiosis
  – meiotic prophase i
  – chromosome pairing
  – synaptonemal complex
  – pachytene stage
  – metaphase
  – mitosis
  – anaphase
  – metaphase
  – prometaphase
  – prophase
  – telophase
  – prometaphase
  – prophase
  – meiotic prophase i
  – chromosome pairing
  – synaptonemal complex
  – pachytene stage
  – telophase
  – cytokinesis
  – interphase
  – g0 phase
  – g1 phase
  – g2 phase
  – s phase

– cell death
  – apoptosis
  – anoikis
  – dna fragmentation
  – autophagy
  – necrosis

– cell differentiation
  – adipogenesis
  – embryonic induction
  – gametogenesis
  – oogenesis
  – vitellogenesis
  – spermatogenesis
  – sperm maturation
  – hematopoiesis
  – erythropoiesis
  – hematopoiesis, extramedullary
  – leukopoiesis
  – lymphopoiesis
  – myelopoiesis
  – thrombopoiesis

– cell fusion

– cell growth processes
  – cell enlargement
  – cell proliferation
  – cell division
  – cell nucleus division
  – anaphase
  – chromosome segregation
  – meiosis
  – meiotic prophase i
  – chromosome pairing
  – synaptonemal complex
  – pachytene stage
  – metaphase
  – mitosis
  – anaphase
  – metaphase
  – prometaphase
  – prophase
  – telophase
  – prometaphase
  – prophase
  – meiotic prophase i
  – chromosome pairing
  – synaptonemal complex
  – pachytene stage
  – telophase
  – cytokinesis

– cell membrane permeability

– cell movement
  – cell aggregation
  – chemotaxis
  – chemotaxis, leukocyte
  – leukocyte rolling
  – ovum transport
  – sperm motility
  – sperm transport

– cell polarity

– cell respiration
  – cell hypoxia
  – respiratory burst

– cell shape

– cell size

– cell survival

– contact inhibition

– cytoplasmic streaming
  – axonal transport

– dna packaging
  – chromatin assembly and disassembly

– endocytosis
  – phagocytosis
  – autophagy
  – pinocytosis

– exocytosis
  – cell degranulation

– ion channel gating

– lymphocyte cooperation

– membrane fusion

– mitochondrial swelling

– receptor aggregation
  – immunologic capping

– receptor cross-talk

– signal transduction
  – ion channel gating
  – map kinase signaling system
  – mechanotransduction, cellular
  – phototransduction
  – second messenger systems
  – calcium signaling
  – synaptic transmission

– immunity

– antibody-dependent enhancement

– antibody diversity

– antibody formation

– antibody specificity
  – organ specificity
  – species specificity

– antigen-antibody reactions
  – agglutination
  – hemagglutination
  – sperm agglutination
  – antibody affinity
  – antigenic modulation
  – binding sites, antibody
  – cross reactions
  – hemolysis
  – immunologic capping
  – passive cutaneous anaphylaxis
  – rh isoimmunization

– autoimmunity

– cd4-cd8 ratio

– complement activation
  – complement pathway, alternative
  – complement pathway, classical
  – complement pathway, mannose-binding lectin

– cross-priming

– cytotoxicity, immunologic
  – antibody-dependent cell cytotoxicity
  – macrophage activation

– dose-response relationship, immunologic

– histamine release

– hiv seronegativity

– immune tolerance
  – clonal anergy
  – clonal deletion
  – self tolerance
  – tachyphylaxis
  – transplantation tolerance

– immunity, active

– immunity, cellular
  – antigen presentation
  – immunologic surveillance
  – lymphocyte activation
  – cross-priming
  – transplantation immunology
  – graft vs host reaction
  – graft vs tumor effect
  – graft vs leukemia effect
  – histocompatibility
  – host vs graft reaction
  – graft rejection
  – graft survival

– immunity, herd

– immunity, maternally-acquired

– immunity, mucosal

– immunity, natural
  – blood bactericidal activity
  – phagocytosis

– immunocompetence

– immunocompromised host
  – radiation chimera

– immunogenetics
  – antibody diversity
  – antigenic variation
  – gene rearrangement, b-lymphocyte
  – gene rearrangement, b-lymphocyte, heavy chain
  – immunoglobulin class switching
  – gene rearrangement, b-lymphocyte, light chain
  – gene rearrangement, t-lymphocyte
  – gene rearrangement, alpha-chain t-cell antigen receptor
  – gene rearrangement, beta-chain t-cell antigen receptor
  – gene rearrangement, delta-chain t-cell antigen receptor
  – gene rearrangement, gamma-chain t-cell antigen receptor
  – genes, immunoglobulin
  – immunoglobulin allotypes
  – immunoglobulin gm allotypes
  – immunoglobulin km allotypes
  – immunoglobulin idiotypes
  – major histocompatibility complex
  – genes, mhc class i
  – genes, mhc class ii
  – minor histocompatibility loci
  – minor lymphocyte stimulatory loci
  – somatic hypermutation, immunoglobulin

– immunologic memory

– lymphocyte cooperation

– neuroimmunomodulation

– neutrophil activation

– neutrophil infiltration

– t-cell antigen receptor specificity

– tumor escape

– plant physiology

– germination

– gravity perception

– photosynthesis

– plant diseases
  – plant tumors

– plant infertility

– plant transpiration

– tropism
  – gravitropism
  – phototropism

– species specificity

The list continues at List of MeSH codes (G05).

G04